Benjamin Alvord is the name of:

 Benjamin Alvord (mathematician) (1813–1884), American soldier, mathematician, and botanist
 Benjamin Alvord, Jr. (1860–1927), son of the above, American soldier, U.S. general during World War I

See also 
 Alvord (surname)